Berrien County is a county on the south line of Michigan, at the southwestern corner of the state. As of the 2020 Census, the population was 154,316. The county seat is St. Joseph.

Berrien County is included in the Niles-Benton Harbor, MI Metropolitan Statistical Area, which is also included in the South Bend-Elkhart-Mishawaka, IN-MI Combined Statistical Area.

History
As one of the Cabinet counties, Berrien County was named for John M. Berrien of Georgia, US Attorney General (1829–1831) under US President Andrew Jackson. The county was founded in 1829, and was organized in 1831, before Michigan was accepted into the Union as a state.

When Michigan Territory was established in 1805, the area of present Berrien County was included in the boundary of Wayne County.

About 1780, New Jersey resident William Burnett established a trading post at the mouth of the St. Joseph River (present-day site of St. Joseph) to serve indigenous peoples and French Canadian residents. Also during that time, Joseph Bertrand established a trading post on the river, in present–day Niles Charter Township. In December 1822, missionary Isaac McCoy moved his family and 18 Indian students from Indiana to the St. Joseph River near present-day Niles, Michigan, to open a religious mission (the Carey Mission) to the Potawatomi Indians, 160 km from the nearest White settlement.

In 1827 St. Joseph Township was organized as part of Wayne County, It included all lands acquired from the Native Americans by the 1821 Treaty of Chicago.

The boundary of Berrien County was delineated by the Michigan Territory Legislature on October 29, 1829, with its present limits. For purposes of revenue, taxation and judicial matters, it was attached to Cass County, and was designated as Niles Township. This assignation was terminated in 1831 when Berrien County's government was organized and initiated.

Berrien County began with three townships:
 Berrien Township – consisted of present-day townships of Berrien, Oronoko, Baroda and Lake plus a two-mile strip north of that territory
 St. Joseph Township – consisted of the area north of Berrien Township
 Niles Township – consisted of the area south of Berrien Township.

In recent times, Berrien County, especially the coastal cities of New Buffalo and Lakeside, has received notice as a vacation destination for Chicago area residents and other Midwesterners. It has earned multiple nicknames in this capacity, including "Harbor Country" and "the Hamptons of the Midwest", with the latter recognized by the Wall Street Journal.

Politics
Berrien County has favored a Republican Party candidate in all but six elections since 1884.

Government
The county government operates the jail, maintains rural roads, operates the major local courts, records deeds, mortgages and vital records, oversees public health, and participates with the state in welfare and social services. The county board of commissioners controls the budget and has limited authority to make laws and ordinances. In Michigan, most local government functions — police, fire, building and zoning, tax assessment, street maintenance, etc. — are the responsibility of individual cities and townships.

Elected officials
 Prosecuting Attorney: Steve Pierangeli
 Sheriff: L. Paul Bailey
 County Clerk: Sharon Tyler 
 County Treasurer: Shelly Weich 
 Register of Deeds: Lora Freehling
 Drain Commissioner: Christopher J. Quattrin
 County Surveyor: John G. Kamer
 1st District County Commissioner: David Vollrath (R-Coloma)
 2nd District County Commissioner: Jon Hinkelman (R-Watervliet)
 3rd District County Commissioner: Chokwe Pitchford (D-Benton Harbor)
 4th District County Commissioner: Mamie Yarbrough (D-Benton Harbor)
 5th District County Commissioner: Rayonte Bell (D-St. Joseph)
 6th District County Commissioner: Julie Wuerfel (R-St. Joseph)
 7th District County Commissioner: Bob Harrison (R-Stevensville)
 8th District County Commissioner: Teri Freehling (R-Baroda)
 9th District County Commissioner: Alex Ott (R-Buchanan)
 10th District County Commissioner: Mac Elliot (R-Buchanan)
 11th District County Commissioner: Jim Curran (R-Niles)
 12th District County Commissioner: Michael Majerek (R-Niles)
(information as of February 2023)

Geography

The county borders the state of Indiana to the South and includes a portion of Lake Michigan to the West.

The St. Joseph River is a major geographical feature, flowing mostly north and west through the county from Niles to its mouth on Lake Michigan at St. Joseph. The southwest of the county is drained by the Galien River and its tributaries. Paw Paw Lake is in the north of the county, along with the Paw Paw River, which flows into the St. Joseph River just before it enters Lake Michigan. A tiny portion along the Indiana state line is drained by small tributaries of the Kankakee River, which ultimately flows into the Mississippi River. This is one of two areas of Michigan drained by the Mississippi River, the other being an area of Michigan's Upper Peninsula near the Wisconsin border.

Major highways
  – runs north along the western edge of the county near Lake Michigan. Turns inland to skirt the St. Joseph/Benton Harbor urban area. Runs east to Kalamazoo. Business Loop 94 passes through downtown Benton Harbor and St. Joseph.
  – runs through St. Joseph and Benton Harbor.
  – from its intersection with I-94 east of Benton Harbor, runs north to Holland, then east to Grand Rapids.
  – runs east–west through the southern portion of the county from south of Niles through Three Oaks to New Buffalo and Michiana, Michigan. From Berrien County it connects with Michigan City, Indiana.
  – running north from South Bend, Indiana, enters the southeast county as the St. Joseph Valley Parkway, near Niles, and continues north and west. A segment of the freeway was completed in August 2003, running from Berrien Springs north to Napier Avenue east of Benton Harbor. US 31 follows Napier Avenue west to I-94 before branching off with I-196. A final segment is planned to continue the freeway from Napier Avenue north to the junction with I-94 and BL I-94 with a full cloverleaf interchange. The former route of US 31 between Berrien Springs and St. Joseph was redesignated as M-139.
  – enters from Indiana as a continuation of State Road 933. Runs north through Niles, then northeast toward Dowagiac, Michigan.
  – runs east from Niles to I-94 at Jackson.
  – from its intersection with M-140, runs east toward Dowagiac, Michigan.
  – from its intersection with M-139 (formerly US 31) in Scottdale, runs northwest into St. Joseph, then northeast to intersection with US 31/I-196 near the county line.
  – from its intersection with US 12 southwest of Niles, runs northeasterly into downtown Niles, then follows the former route of US 31 US 33 northwesterly through Berrien Springs to Scottdale, then north near St. Joseph and Benton Harbor to an intersection with Business Loop I-94.
  – from Niles, runs north through the eastern part of the county toward South Haven, Michigan.
  – its  length links I-94 at Exit 1 near New Buffalo to State Road 39 north of LaPorte, Indiana.
  – Berrien County's only signed county highway. Begins in Hagar Shores at M-63 and I-196. It follows the Lake Michigan shoreline and continues to South Haven, Michigan.

Adjacent counties
By land
 Van Buren County – north and northeast
 Cass County – east
 St. Joseph County, Indiana – southeast
 LaPorte County, Indiana – south
By water
 Porter County, Indiana – southwest
 Cook County, Illinois – west
 Lake County, Illinois – northwest

Demographics

The 2010 United States Census indicates Berrien County had a 2010 population of 156,813. This is a decrease of 5,640 people from the 2000 United States Census, or a 3.5% population decrease. In 2010 there were 63,054 households and 41,585 families in the county. The population density was 276.2 per square mile (106.6 square kilometers). There were 76,922 housing units at an average density of 135.5 per square mile (52.3 square kilometers). 78.3% of the population were White, 15.3% Black or African American, 1.6% Asian, 0.5% Native American, 0.1% Pacific Islander, 1.8% of some other race and 2.4% of two or more races. 4.5% were Hispanic or Latino (of any race). 29.0% were of German, 7.4% Irish, 6.8% English and 5.5% American ancestry.

There were 63,054 households, 29.6% of which had children under the age of 18 living with them, 47.8% were husband and wife families, 13.6% had a female householder with no husband present, 34.0% were non-families, and 28.7% were made up of individuals. The average household size was 2.43 and the average family size was 2.98.

The county population contained 23.4% under age of 18, 8.5% from 18 to 24, 23.2% from 25 to 44, 28.6% from 45 to 64, and 16.3% who were 65 years of age or older. The median age was 41 years. For every 100 females there were 94.9 males. For every 100 females age 18 and over, there were 91.6 males.

The 2010 American Community Survey 1-year estimate indicates the median income for a household in the county was $40,329 and the median income for a family was $51,305. Males had a median income of $26,745 versus $16,289 for females. The per capita income for the county was $22,337. About 12.1% of families and 16.8% of the population were below the poverty line, including 28.5% of those under the age 18 and 8.3% of those age 65 or over.

Recreation

State parks
 Grand Mere State Park
 Warren Dunes State Park
 Warren Woods State Park

County parks

 Galien River County Park Preserve
 Love Creek County Park
 Madeline Bertrand County Park
 Paw Paw River County Park
 Rocky Gap County Park
 Silver Beach County Park

Other parks 

 Expo Arena – at Berrien County Fairgrounds
 Kiwanis Park – St. Joseph
 Riverview Park – St. Joseph

Resorts and beaches

 Hagar Park – Hagar Township
 Jean Klock Park - Benton Harbor
 Lion's Park Beach – St. Joseph
 New Buffalo Beach Park – New Buffalo
 Paw Paw Lake
 Rocky Gap Beach Park - Benton Harbor
 Silver Beach - St. Joseph
 Tiscornia Park
 Weko Beach - Bridgman

Golf courses

 The Golf Club at Harbor Shores - Benton Harbor
 Blossom Trails Golf Club – Benton Harbor
 Brookwood Golf Course - Buchanan
 Lake Michigan Hills Golf Club - Benton Harbor
 Lost Dunes Golf Club - Bridgman
 Milan Creek Golf Club - Baroda
 Orchard Hills Country Club - Buchanan
 Paw Paw Lake Golf Club - Coloma/Watervliet
 Pebblewood Country Club - Bridgman
 Pipestone Creek Golf Course - Eau Claire
 Point O'Woods Golf & Country Club - Benton Harbor

Wineries

 12 Corners Vineyards - Benton Harbor
 Baroda Founders Wine Cellar - Baroda
 Contessa Wine Cellars - Coloma
 Dablon Winery and Vineyard - Baroda
 Domaine Berrien Cellars – Berrien Springs
 Free Run Cellars - Berrien Springs
 Gravity - Baroda
 Hickory Creek Winery - Buchanan
 Karma Vista Vineyards - Coloma
 Lazy Ballerina Winery - St. Joseph
 Lemon Creek Winery – Berrien Springs
 Round Barn Winery, Distillery & Brewery - Baroda
 Tabor Hill Winery and Restaurant - Buchanan
 White Pine Winery - St. Joseph
 Vineyard 2121 - Benton Harbor
 Red Top Winery - Baroda

Communities

Cities

 Benton Harbor
 Bridgman
 Buchanan
 Coloma
 New Buffalo
 Niles
 St. Joseph (county seat)
 Watervliet

Villages

 Baroda
 Berrien Springs
 Eau Claire
 Galien
 Grand Beach
 Michiana
 Shoreham
 Stevensville
 Three Oaks

Charter townships

 Benton Charter Township
 Coloma Charter Township
 Lake Charter Township
 Lincoln Charter Township
 Niles Charter Township
 Oronoko Charter Township
 St. Joseph Charter Township
 Watervliet Charter Township

Civil townships

 Bainbridge Township
 Baroda Township
 Berrien Township
 Bertrand Township
 Buchanan Township
 Chikaming Township
 Galien Township
 Hagar Township
 New Buffalo Township
 Pipestone Township
 Royalton Township
 Sodus Township
 Three Oaks Township
 Weesaw Township

Census-designated places
 Benton Heights
 Fair Plain
 Lake Michigan Beach
 Millburg
 New Troy
 Paw Paw Lake
 Shorewood-Tower Hills-Harbert

Other unincorporated communities

 Berrien Center
 Bethany Beach
 Birchwood
 Dayton
 Glendora
 Harbert
 Hazelhurst
 Hinchman
 Lakeside
 Millburg
 Riverside
 Sawyer
 Scottdale
 Shorewood Hills
 Tower Hill Shorelands
 Union Pier

Indian reservation

 The Pokagon Band of Potawatomi Indians has a reservation occupying a portion of the southeastern corner of Berrien County. The tribe also occupies areas in Allegan, Cass, and Van Buren counties, as well as extending south into the state of Indiana. The reservation headquarters are located in neighboring Cass County in the city of Dowagiac. The Berrien County reservation surrounds the entire portion of the city of Niles that lies within the county, as well as portions of Bertrand Township and Niles Charter Township along the St. Joseph River.

See also
 List of Michigan State Historic Sites in Berrien County, Michigan
 National Register of Historic Places listings in Berrien County, Michigan
 Berrien County Government

References

External links
 Berrien County government – official web site
 Berrien County Health Department
 Berrien County Road Department
 Berrien County Sheriff's Department
 Berrien County GenGuide for Berrien County Genealogy Information
 
 History of Berrien and Van Buren counties, Michigan (Ensign, 1880)
 History of Berrien County (Southwest Michigan Directory)

 
Michigan counties
1831 establishments in Michigan Territory
Populated places established in 1831